Jackline Wambui (born 8 February 2000) is a Kenyan middle-distance runner who competes in the 800 metres event.

Wambui won the gold medal in the 800 meters at the 2017 IAAF World U18 Championships in Nairobi. The following year, she finished eighth at the 2018 IAAF World U20 Championships in Tampere. In April 2019, she won the African Junior Championships in Abidjan, and then in August won the Kenyan National Championships.

She withdrew from the 2019 IAAF World Athletics Championships after not taking a mandatory testosterone level test.

Her personal best for the 800m is 1:58.79, set at Nyayo National Stadium, Nairobi, on 13 September 2019.

References

Living people
2000 births
Kenyan female middle-distance runners